Nik (also Romanized as Nīk, Nig, and Neyk; also known as Neyj and Nik Mo’men Abad) is a village in Momenabad Rural District, in the Central District of Sarbisheh County, South Khorasan Province, Iran. At the 2006 census, its population was 201, in 57 families.

References 

Populated places in Sarbisheh County